The men's 10,000 metres walk event at the 1957 World University Games was held at the Stadium Charlety in Paris on 5 September 1957. There were only two starters, both from Poland. It was the first time race walking was featured at the World University Games (future Universiade) and also the last until 1981.

Results

References

Athletics at the 1957 World University Games
1957